was a Japanese daimyō of the mid-Edo period, who ruled the Hasunoike Domain in Hizen Province (modern-day Saga Prefecture).

References
 Naoharu on Nekhet's "World Nobility" site (14 September 2007)

1746 births
1775 deaths
Tozama daimyo
Nabeshima clan